Arturo Hernández (born 12 March 1991) is a Mexican badminton player. He competed at the 2014 Central American and Caribbean Games, winning a silver medal in the mixed team event.

Achievements

BWF International Challenge/Series 
Men's singles

Men's doubles

Mixed doubles

  BWF International Challenge tournament
  BWF International Series tournament
  BWF Future Series tournament

References

External links 
 

1991 births
Living people
Mexican male badminton players
Competitors at the 2014 Central American and Caribbean Games
Central American and Caribbean Games silver medalists for Mexico
Central American and Caribbean Games medalists in badminton